The 2011 European Mixed Team Badminton Championships were held at the Sporthallen Zuid in Amsterdam, Netherlands, from February 15–20, and were organised by the Badminton Europe and the Nederlandse Badminton Bond. It was the 21st edition of the tournament. Denmark was the defending champion. The draw was made on 17 December 2010.

Denmark defeated Germany in the final 3–1 to defend their title.

Medalists

Group stage

Group 1

Group 2

Group 3

Group 4

Group 5

Group 6

Group 7

Group 8

Knockout stage

Quarterfinals

Semifinals

Final

References

External links

tournamensoftware.com

European Mixed Team Badminton Championships
European Mixed Team Badminton Championships
Badminton
Badminton tournaments in the Netherlands
International sports competitions hosted by the Netherlands